Stigmella platyzona is a moth of the family Nepticulidae. It was described by Vári in 1963. It is found in South Africa (it was described from the Cape Province).

The larvae feed on Ficus burttdavyi. They probably mine the leaves of their host plant.

References

Endemic moths of South Africa
Nepticulidae
Moths of Africa
Moths described in 1963